Kerry Reed (born October 24, 1984) is a former American football wide receiver. He also played for the BC Lions of the Canadian Football League. He was signed by the Miami Dolphins as an undrafted free agent in 2007. He played college football at Michigan State.

Reed has also been a member of the Baltimore Ravens.

Early years
Reed attended South Dade High School in Homestead, Florida and was a letterman in football. As a senior, he was an All-Dade County Honorable Mention selection.

External links
BC Lions bio
Michigan State Spartans bio

1984 births
Living people
South Dade Senior High School alumni
American football wide receivers
Michigan State Spartans football players
Miami Dolphins players
Baltimore Ravens players
BC Lions players
Arizona Rattlers players
Players of American football from Miami
Players of Canadian football from Miami